Festuca cumminsii is a species of grass in the family Poaceae. This species is native to China North-Central, China South-Central, East Himalaya, Inner Mongolia, Kazakhstan, Kirgizstan, Mongolia, Nepal, Qinghai, Tadzhikistan, Tibet, West Himalaya, and Xinjiang. Festuca cumminsii prefers temperate biomes and is perennial. This species was first described in 1896.

References

cumminsii